En la Luna is the debut album by Mexican singer Reyli, released on September 14, 2004 (see 2004 in music) by Sony International.

Track listing

Original Release
"Calma" – 4:14 (Ornelas; Reyli)
"Hasta Que Amanezca" – 3:53 (Reyli)
"Amor del Bueno" – 4:07 (Reyli)
"Tonto Enamorado" – 3:33 (Reyli)
"Al Fin Me Armé de Valor" – 3:31 (Reyli)
"Desde Que Llegaste" – 3:35 (Reyli)
"Ayúdame" – 4:40 (Reyli)
"Tú" – 3:11 (Mario Domm; Reyli)
"La Descarada" – 3:25 (Reyli)
"Nos Quisimos" – 4:59 (Reyli)
"Sé Quíén Soy [Demo]" – 3:56 (Juantorena; Paníagua; Reyli)
"No Era Necesarío [*]" – 4:11 (Ornelas; Reyli)

En La Luna [SPECIAL EDITION]  (2006)

Sales and certifications

References

External links
Hear the full album at AOL Music

2004 debut albums
Reyli albums